The men's field hockey tournament at the 2007 Australian Youth Olympic Festival was the first edition of the field hockey tournament for men at the AYOF.

Australia won the tournament for the first time by defeating Great Britain 7–6 in a penalty shoot-out in the final, following a 2–2 draw. China won the bronze medal by defeating Malaysia 5–4 in a penalty shoot-out following a 2–2 draw.

Teams

Results

Pool matches

Classification matches

Third and fourth place

Final

Statistics

Final standings

Goalscorers

References

External links

Men's tournament
2007 in Australian field hockey
2007 in field hockey
2007 Australian Youth Olympic Festival